24 teams competed in the 2002 FIVB Women's Volleyball World Championship, with two places allocated for the hosts, Germany and the titleholder, Cuba. In the qualification process for the 2002 FIVB World Championship, the Five FIVB confederations were allocated a share of the 22 remaining spots.

Qualified teams
{| class="wikitable sortable" style="text-align: left;"
|-
!width="140"|Team
!width="80"|Confederation
!width="240"|Qualified as
!width="120"|Qualified on
!width="70"|Appearancein finals
|-
|  || CEV ||  ||  || 
|-
|  || NORCECA ||  ||  || 
|-
|  || CEV ||  ||  || 
|-
|  || CEV ||  ||  || 
|-
|  || CEV ||  ||  || 
|-
|  || CEV ||  ||  || 
|-
|  || AVC ||  ||  || 
|-
|  || AVC ||  ||  || 
|-
|  || CSV ||  ||  || 
|-
|  || CSV ||  ||  || 
|-
|  || NORCECA ||  ||  || 
|-
|  || NORCECA ||  ||  || 
|-
|  || CAVB ||  ||  || 
|-
|  || CEV ||  ||  || 
|-
|  || NORCECA ||  ||  || 
|-
|  || NORCECA ||  ||  || 
|-
|  || CAVB ||  ||  || 
|-
|  || CEV ||  ||  || 
|-
|  || CEV ||  ||  || 
|-
|  || CEV ||  ||  || 
|-
|  || AVC ||  ||  || 
|-
|  || AVC ||  ||  || 
|-
|  || AVC ||  ||  || 
|-
|  || NORCECA ||  ||  || 
|}

1.Competed as West Germany from 1956 to 1990; 3rd appearance as Germany.
2.Competed as Czechoslovakia from 1952 to 1986; 2nd appearance as Czech Republic.
3.Competed as Soviet Union from 1952 to 1990; 3rd appearance as Russia.

Confederation qualification processes
The distribution by confederation for the 2002 FIVB Women's Volleyball World Championship was:

 Asia and Oceania (AVC): 5 places
 Africa (CAVB): 2 places
 Europe (CEV): 8 places (+ Germany qualified automatically as host nation for a total of 9 places)
 South America (CSV) 2.5 places
 North, Central America and Caribbean (NORCECA): 4.5 places (+ Cuba qualified automatically as the defending champions for a total of 5.5 places)

Africa
9 national teams entered qualification. (South Africa and Ghana later withdrew) The teams were distributed according to their position in the FIVB Senior Women's Rankings. Teams ranked 1–7 automatically qualified for the second round.

Pool A
Venue:  Nairobi, Kenya
Dates: July 13–15, 2001

|}

|}

Pool B
Venue:  Cairo, Egypt
Dates: August 3–5, 2001

|}

|}

Asia and Oceania
9 national teams entered qualification. The teams were distributed according to their position in the FIVB Senior Women's Rankings. Teams ranked 1–6 automatically qualified for the second round.

Sub Pool B
Venue:  Colombo, Sri Lanka
Dates: January 18–20, 2001

|}

|}

Pool C
Venue:  Bangkok, Thailand
Dates: July 6–8, 2001

|}

|}

Pool D
Venue:  Macau
Dates: August 31 – September 2, 2001

|}

|}

Europe
25 national teams entered qualification. The teams were distributed according to their position in the FIVB Senior Women's Rankings. Teams ranked 1–23 automatically qualified for the second round.

Sub Pool C
Venue:  Baku, Azerbaijan
Dates: February 2–3, 2001

|}

|}

Pool E
Venue:  's-Hertogenbosch, Netherlands
Dates: June 17–19, 2001

|}

|}

Pool F
Venue:  Opole, Poland
Dates: June 24–26, 2001

|}

|}

Pool G
Venue:  Lisbon, Portugal
Dates: June 22–24, 2001

|}

|}

Pool H
Venue:  Novy Urengoy, Russia
Dates: June 22–24, 2001

|}

|}

Pool I
Venue:  Urbino, Italy
Dates: July 13–15, 2001

|}

|}

Pool J
Venue:  Dubrovnik, Croatia
Dates: August 27–29, 2001

|}

|}

Second placed teams

|}

North, Central America and Caribbean
10 national teams entered qualification. The teams were distributed according to their position in the FIVB Senior Women's Rankings. Teams ranked 1–7 automatically qualified for the second round.

Sub Pool D
Venue:  Oranjestad, Aruba
Dates: June 14–16, 2001

|}

|}

Pool K
Venue:  Santo Domingo, Dominican Republic
Dates: July 12–14, 2001

|}

|}

Pool L
Venue:  San Juan, Puerto Rico
Dates: July 13–15, 2001

|}

|}

Third placed teams

|}

South America
6 national teams entered qualification. (Uruguay and Chile later withdrew) The teams were distributed according to their position in the FIVB Senior Women's Rankings. Teams ranked 1–3 automatically qualified for the second round.

Pool M
Venue:  Santa Fe, Argentina
Dates: July 6–8, 2001

|}

|}

Playoff
Venue:  Monterrey, Mexico
Dates: September 7–9, 2001

|}

|}

References

External links
Women's World Championship,  Germany 2002 – Qualifications Tournaments

FIVB Volleyball Women's World Championship
2001 in volleyball
FIVB Volleyball World Championship qualification